Hungarian Sportspeople of the Year awards are granted each year since 1958, with categories for sportsmen, sportswomen, teams, coaches (since 1985) and presidents (since 1995).

List of winners

Statistics

Individual winners of three or more titles

Breakdown of winners by sport

Men

Women

Coach/President of the Year

External links 
 List of winners on the website of the Association of Hungarian Journalists
 Sportspeople of the Year 2014 (Hungarian language)
 Sportspeople of the Year 2015 (Hungarian language)
 Sportspeople of the Year 2016 (Hungarian language)
 Sportspeople of the Year 2017 (Hungarian language)
 Sportspeople of the Year 2018 (Hungarian language)
 Sportspeople of the Year 2020 (Hungarian language)
 Sportspeople of the Year 2021 (Hungarian language)
 Sportspeople of the Year 2022 (Hungarian language)

Sportspeople
National sportsperson-of-the-year trophies and awards

Awards established in 1958
1958 establishments in Hungary